A list of films produced in France in 1928:

See also
1928 in France

References

External links
French films of 1928 on IMDb
French films of 1928 at Cinema-francais.fr

1928
French
Films